Thunder in Paradise is an American action-adventure TV series from the creators of Baywatch, which stars Hulk Hogan, Chris Lemmon, and Carol Alt. This first-run syndicated TV series originally premiered as a direct-to-video feature film in September 1993, then ran for one season from March 25 until November 27, 1994, before being cancelled. In May 1994, during a taping of WCW Saturday Night, Hogan publicly expressed a desire to return to professional wrestling and hinted that he would no longer be a part of the show. The series was later rebroadcast on the TNT cable network.

Series concept
Thunder in Paradise follows the adventures of two ex-United States Navy SEALs, Randolph J. "Hurricane" Spencer and Martin "Bru" Brubaker, who work as mercenaries out of their tropical resort headquarters along Florida's Gulf Coast of the United States. Using their futuristic, high-tech boat, nicknamed Thunder, they travel around the world fighting various criminals and villains. They must also balance their dangerous undercover work with their responsibilities of raising widower Spencer's young stepdaughter Jessica, who lives with them.

Former model Kelly LaRue, who owns and manages the Scuttlebutt Bar & Grill on the beach in front of the resort, looks after Jessica whenever Spence and Bru go on their missions. Kelly also serves as a romantic foil for Bru. Edward Whitaker, Jessica's uncle, owns the beach resort and makes semi-regular appearances in the series, primarily for comic relief.

Characters

Main cast
 Hulk Hogan as Randolph J. "Hurricane" Spencer
 Chris Lemmon as Martin "Bru" Brubaker
 Carol Alt as Kelly LaRue
 Ashley Gorrell as Jessica Whitaker Spencer (episodes 4–22)
 Patrick Macnee as Edward Whitaker
 Felicity Waterman as Megan Whitaker Spencer (episodes 1–3)
 Robin Weisman as Jessica Whitaker Spencer (episodes 1–3)
 Russ Wheeler as The Voice of Thunder
 Sam J. Jones as Pilot
 Michael Andrews as The Beach Bartender

Recurring cast
 Steve Borden (WCW's "Sting") as "Hammerhead" McCall
 Kiki Shepard as Trelawny / DJ Moran
 Heidi Mark as Alison Wilson
 Jimmy Hart as Jimmy

Episodes

Home media
 The pilot movie was originally released on home video the week of September 27, 1993. It was not broadcast on television until the beginning of Season 1, after which it was split into two episodes for reruns and later syndication.
 The two-part episode "Sealed with a Kismet" was combined and released to home video as the feature Thunder in Paradise II.
 The two-part episode "Deadly Lessons" was combined and released to home video as the feature Thunder in Paradise 3.
 The two-part episode "The M.A.J.O.R. and the Minor" was used as the basis for the Thunder in Paradise CD-i interactive game. In addition to the episode itself, additional footage was filmed for use at different stages in the game. This game-exclusive footage was shot at the same time as the episode itself. Another video game based on Thunder in Paradise, this one from The Software Toolworks, was announced for the Super Nintendo Entertainment System and Sega Genesis, but never released.

In September 2006, Lionsgate released a DVD 3-disc Thunder in Paradise Collection that contained Thunder in Paradise ("Thunder in Paradise" Parts 1 & 2), Thunder in Paradise II ("Sealed with a Kismet" Parts 1 & 2), and Thunder in Paradise 3 ("Deadly Lessons" Part 1 & 2).

Filming locations
The Thunder in Paradise pilot movie was filmed in and around the historic The Don CeSar hotel in St. Pete Beach, Florida, during April 1992. When the series was picked up for a full season, the production company then moved to Disney's Hollywood Studios near Orlando, Florida, where the primary filming location became Disney's Grand Floridian Resort & Spa at Walt Disney World. Other filming locations at Walt Disney World included Disney's Old Key West Resort, Disney's Fort Wilderness Resort & Campground, and Epcot, used heavily due to the wide variety of futuristic and international architectural styles available at that theme park. The destruction of the school featured in the two-part episode "Deadly Lessons" was an actual controlled demolition of a school building in Central Florida that the production company agreed to perform in exchange for filming rights. Stetson University in DeLand, Florida was utilized for an episode.

Reception

On the release of the DVD collection in 2006, the series was reviewed by David Cornelius of DVD Talk: 

Cornelius admits to giving the series a higher rating than usual, and selectively recommends it but warns that "those not so fond of Bad Movie fun, meanwhile, should obviously skip it". In 2008, Entertainment Weekly ranked it as the "cheesiest" syndicated TV series.

See also

References

External links
 
 
 
 
 
 
  
 

1994 American television series debuts
1994 American television series endings
American action television series
English-language television shows
First-run syndicated television programs in the United States
Nautical television series
Television series by CBS Studios
Television series by Lionsgate Television
Television shows set in Florida